The New Jersey Department of Corrections (NJDOC) is responsible for operations and management of prison facilities in the U.S. state of New Jersey. The department operates 13 major institutions—seven adult male correctional facilities, three youth facilities, one facility for sex offenders, one women's correctional institution and a central reception / intake unit—and a Stabilization and Reintegration Program.  The department is headquartered in Trenton.

The NJDOC's facilities house a combined total of 20,000 inmates in minimum, medium and maximum security levels. Approximately 1,200 inmates are incarcerated, and an equal number released each month. The median term for inmates is six years. 47% of inmates are serving terms of one-to-five years; 17% are serving terms of six-to-nine years; and 33% are serving maximum sentences of 10 years or more. As of January 2003, 984 offenders were serving life sentences, including 14 offenders under death sentences (all of which have now been commuted, as capital punishment was abolished in 2007).

Jurisdiction and law enforcement authority
New Jersey State Correctional Police Officers, Parole Officers and Corrections Investigators are authorized to exercise police officer powers statewide. With this authority, Correctional Police Officers are required to enforce NJRS 2C (New Jersey Criminal Code) within the scope of their employment.

New Jersey State Correctional Police Officers are authorized to carry on duty the Heckler & Koch USP in .40 S&W. Correction Officers may optionally qualify to carry an authorized off-duty firearm.  All off-duty firearms and ammunition must conform to the approved list provided by the New Jersey Department of Corrections.

Since the establishment of the New Jersey Department of Corrections, 24 officers have died in the line of duty.

Ranks

There are four sworn titles (referred to as ranks) in the New Jersey Department of Corrections:

Media campaigns
The New Jersey Department of Corrections established the "Be Smart Choose Freedom" television advertisement campaign in 2005. The State of New Jersey produced 30–60-second public service announcements to warn state residents against going to prison. The Mississippi Department of Corrections, the state corrections agency of Mississippi, decided to start its own "Be Smart Choose Freedom" campaign and use the commercials that aired in New Jersey. The NJDOC commercials were available in English, with one public service announcement also having a Spanish version.

Facilities

Prison capacity and costs
According to the state budget for fiscal year 2016, the Department of Corrections has capacity to house 20,634 inmates and anticipates a daily average population of 18,894 inmates. It has 6,950 employees for a personnel ratio of 1 person for every 2.8 inmates. The state legislature appropriated $808.4 million to the Department of Corrections in the fiscal year ending June 30, 2014, of which $525 million was used in salaries and wages.

Death row

Prior to the 2007 repeal of the death penalty, the death row for men and the execution chamber were in the Capital Sentence Unit (CSU) at the New Jersey State Prison. This unit was first established in 1907. The first death by electrocution occurred on December 11, 1907. On December 17, 2007, Governor Jon Corzine signed a bill passed by the New Jersey General Assembly passed which abolishes the death penalty, making New Jersey the first state to legislatively eliminate capital punishment since 1965. The day prior, December 16, 2007, Governor Corzine commuted the death sentences of the remaining eight men on death row to "life imprisonment without parole".

See also

 List of New Jersey state prisons
 List of law enforcement agencies in New Jersey
 List of United States state correction agencies

References

External links
New Jersey Department of Corrections

 
State corrections departments of the United States
Penal system in New Jersey
State law enforcement agencies of New Jersey